Fatali Khan Isgender oglu Khoyski (– 19 June 1920) was an Azerbaijani attorney, a member of the Second State Duma of the Russian Empire, Minister of Internal Affairs, Minister of Defense and, later the first Prime Minister of the independent Azerbaijan Democratic Republic.

Early life
His great grandfather Jafar Qoli, the Khan of Khoy was defeated by the Iranian Fath-Ali Shah and with his 20,000 army retreated to Echmiadzin. In the 1804-1813 Russo-Persian war, Jafar Qoli Khan sided with Russian Empire and was therefore rewarded by tsar Alexander I by being appointed the Khan of Shaki Khanate and his rank was raised to lieutenant colonel.

After receiving his school education at Ganja gymnasium, Fatali Khan studied at the Law Faculty of the Moscow University, from which he graduated in 1901. After graduation, Khoyski worked as a court lawyer in Ganja, Sukhumi, Batumi, Kutaisi. Once he was appointed Assistant Prosecutor of Yekaterinodar county court, he began to be involved in socio-political activities.

Political career

Russian Empire

Khoyski was elected a deputy to the Second Duma of Russian Empire from Elizavetpol Governorate. While delivering a speech before the Duma on 2 February 1907, he criticized the Russian colonization policies in Azerbaijan and the Caucasus. Although he was formally registered with Constitutional Democratic Party (known as the Kadets), he also joined the Muslim fraction in Duma. On 27 March, soon after the 1917 February revolution in Russia, Khoyski became a member of the Temporary Executive Committee of Muslim National Councils (MNCs). During the first Musavat summit on 26–31 October 1917, Khoyski spoke in favor of autonomy for Azerbaijan. In December 1917, he was elected a member of the newly created Transcaucasian Sejm and subsequently appointed the Minister of Justice of an independent Transcaucasian Democratic Federative Republic.

Azerbaijan Democratic Republic
On 28 May 1918, the republic dissolved and an independent Azerbaijan Democratic Republic was proclaimed. It was the first state ever in the Muslim world to function and be based on principles of republic government. Fatali Khan was put in charge of forming the first cabinet of the republic. Prime Minister Khoyski had the distinct honor to send radiogram to the main political centers of the world on the proclamation of an independent Azerbaijan republic on 30 May 1918. When the government moved to its temporary residence in the city of Ganja the government encountered serious challenges. Azerbaijani statehood came under fire. On 17 June, Fatali Khan announced the resignation of the government at the closed session of the National Council but he was assigned to form the government again. In addition to the post of prime minister, he was the post of justice minister in the second government.

Khoyski served as the Chairman of Cabinet of Ministers and Minister of Internal Affairs. On 17 June 1918, the second government was formed by Khoyski led by Nasib Yusifbeyli. He played a significant role in making an alliance with the Turkish government, defeating and removing the Centrocaspian Dictatorship from power in Baku as well as establishing diplomatic ties with other countries. On 22 December, he was elected as a foreign minister of the newly formed government. Khoyski protected Azerbaijan's statehood in this post. Furthermore, he defended the independence of Azerbaijan by achieving the recognition of the independence of Azerbaijan at the Paris Peace Conference. He is also credited for establishing the Azerbaijan State University. During the period of the third government formed by Khoyski, he served as Chairman of the National Council and Minister of Foreign Affairs of Azerbaijan. During his term in office, he succeeded in removing the city names Yelisavetpol and restoring the historic name of Ganja and renaming the uezd of Karyagino to Jabrayil, establishing a multi-party system, the printing of Azerbaijani postage stamps and Azerbaijani currency Manat, founding schools and colleges teaching in Azerbaijani. In March 1919, the third government dissolved.

In January 1920, when the Allied Powers de facto recognized Azerbaijan Democratic Republic, Council of Allied Powers, Georgy Chicherin, the Soviet Commissar for Foreign Affairs repeatedly mailed Khoyski asking him to open a new front to confront Anton Denikin and his White movement to which Fatali Khan gave negative responses saying ADR would not meddle into internal affairs of Russia. In his fourth last correspondence, Chicherin notified Khoyski about the upcoming invasion of the 11th Red Army of Azerbaijan. Khoyski moved his family to Tbilisi before the Bolshevik Red Army invaded Baku on 28 April 1920.

Assassination
Fatali Khan Khoyski was assassinated in Tiflis (present-day Tbilisi), near the central Erivansky Square on 19 June 1920 by Aram Yerganian as part of Operation Nemesis organised by the Armenian Revolutionary Federation (ARF). The ARF accused Khoyski in having played a major role in the September 1918 massacre of Armenians in Baku. His burial ceremony was arranged by the Persian consulate in Tiflis.

Family 
He was married to an ethnic Russian woman Eugenia Vasilevna who upon conversion to Islam, accepted the name Jeyran Khanum. Together they had three children:

 Tamara Khoyskaya (1902-1990) — married to Mirza Davud Huseynov
 Murad Khoyski (1910-1973)
 Anvar Khoyski (1914-1935)

His elder brother Huseyngulu khan was deputy governor of Ganja Governorate between 1918 and 1920. Younger brother Rustam Khan Khoyski served as Minister of Social Security of Azerbaijan Democratic Republic.

See also
Azerbaijani National Council
 List of Ministers of Internal Affairs of Azerbaijan

References

External links

 Founders of the Republic: Fatali Khan Khoyski

1875 births
1920 deaths
People from Shaki, Azerbaijan
People from Elizavetpol Governorate
Khoyski family
Azerbaijani nobility
Azerbaijani people of Iranian descent
Azerbaijani Shia Muslims
Azerbaijani nationalists
Prime Ministers of Azerbaijan
Interior Ministers of Azerbaijan
Ministers of Defense of Azerbaijan
Members of the 2nd State Duma of the Russian Empire
Azerbaijan Democratic Republic politicians
Prosecutors General of Azerbaijan 
Military personnel of the Russian Empire
20th-century Azerbaijani lawyers
People murdered in Georgia (country)
Azerbaijani independence activists
Assassinated Azerbaijani politicians
People assassinated by Operation Nemesis
Burials at Pantheon of prominent Azerbaijanis
Murder in the Russian Empire
1920 murders in Europe